The Kalamaja cemetery (or Fischermay Friedhof), in Tallinn in Estonia was once the city's oldest existing cemetery, located in the suburb of Kalamaja in the north of the city. It contained thousands of graves of ethnic Estonian and Swedish residents of Tallinn and stood for at least 400 years, from the 15th or 16th century to 1964 when it was completely flattened and destroyed by the Soviet occupation authorities governing the country at that time. The former cemetery is now a public park: "Kalamaja kalmistupark".

Origins and use
The exact origins of the cemetery are not completely clear, but historians place its foundation to sometime between the 15th and 16th centuries. It was the principal burial ground of the ethnic Swedish and Estonians living in or around Tallinn.

Until the mid to late 19th century the majority of residents of Tallinn were Baltic Germans who had their own separate graveyards within the city walls until 1774, and their own separate cemeteries outside the city after that.

Until its destruction the cemetery had thousands of graves standing of various historical figures from Estonia's history.

Destruction by Soviet authorities in 1964
Shortly after the Second World War and during the second occupation of Baltic states, the suburb of Kalamaja (due to its strategic position as a base for the Red Army on the Gulf of Finland) was turned into a restricted zone for the Soviet military and closed to the public.

In 1964 the cemetery was entirely flattened under the order of Soviet authorities. Gravestones were used to build walls along the ports and sidewalks in other parts of the city and no trace of the cemetery was left standing.

Soviet forces in a coordinated effort to remove all traces of the past, non ethnic Russian, inhabitants of Tallinn also destroyed two further 18th century cemeteries in the city, in the suburbs of Kopli and Mõigu which belonged to the ethnic Estonian and Baltic German communities.

In contrast the Russian Orthodox Cemetery, also established in the 18th century, south of the old town of Tallinn, was left standing.

Current status
Presently the former area of the cemetery is a public park, with no immediate visible indication of its previous status. However a small plaque with a very short description has been put on the site on the side of a restored chapel.

The only surviving evidence of those who were interred there consists of the parish registers of burials and some old detailed maps of the area in the Tallinn city archives.

Gallery

See also
 List of cemeteries in Estonia
 Kopli cemetery
 Mõigu cemetery

References

 Adolf Richters Baltische Verkehrs- und Adreßbücher, Band 3-Estland, Riga 1913
  Schmidt, Christoph. Bergengruens Tod von Reval aus historischer Sicht. Journal of Baltic Studies, 29:4 (1998), 315–325
 Tallinna Kalmistud, Karl Laane, Tallinn, 2002,

External links

 Image of a late 19th or early 20th century map showing the district of Kalamaja and the area of the cemetery
 Another photo of the restored chapel from a distance
 

Demolished buildings and structures in Estonia
Former cemeteries
15th-century establishments in Estonia
1964 in Estonia
Cemeteries in Tallinn